"Love I'm Given" is a song by English singer Ellie Goulding, released as the fourth single from Goulding's fourth studio album Brightest Blue, through Polydor Records on 19 August 2020. It was written by Ellie Goulding, Joe Kearns and Jim Eliot.

Background

Music video
A music video to accompany the release of "Love I'm Given" was first released onto YouTube on 19 August 2020. The video shows Goulding inside a boxing ring during lockdown. The video was directed by Rianne White, who also directed the video for "Flux".

Personnel
Credits adapted from Tidal.
 Jim Eliot – Producer, composer, lyricist
 Joe Kearns – Producer, composer, lyricist, recording engineer, studio personnel
 Mike Wise – Producer, associated performer, bass guitar, drums, guitar, organ, piano, programming, synthesizer programming
 Ellie Goulding – Composer, lyricist, associated performer, vocals
 Zach Bines – Associated performer, vocals
 Manny Park – Asst. Recording Engineer, studio personnel
 Matt Colton – Mastering Engineer, studio personnel
 John Hanes – Mix Engineer, studio personnel
 Serban Ghenea – Mixer, studio personnel
 Jason Elliott – Recording Engineer, studio personnel

Charts

Release history

References

2020 songs
Ellie Goulding songs
Songs written by Ellie Goulding
Songs written by Joe Kearns
Songs written by Jim Eliot
Song recordings produced by Mike Wise (record producer)